Nadarajah or Natarajan is a South Indian male given name. Due to the South Indian tradition of using patronymic surnames it may also be a surname for males and females. It also Nataraja, a depiction of Hindu God Shiva.

Notable people

Given name
 A. Natarajan, Indian politician
 A. K. C. Natarajan (born 1931), Indian musician
 A. R. Natarajan, Indian publisher
 B. Natarajan, Indian politician
 E. M. Natarajan (died 2001), Indian politician
 Indi Nadarajah, Malaysian actor and singer
 K. V. Nadarajah (born 1905), Ceylonese lawyer and politician
 M. Nadarajah, Sri Lankan politician
 N. Nadarajah (born 1897), Ceylonese lawyer and judge
 N. S. N. Nataraj, Indian politician
 N. V. Natarajan (1912–1975), Indian politician
Nadarajah Govindasamy, Singaporean convicted murderer
 Nataraja Guru (1895–1973), Indian social reformer
 Natarajan Subramaniam, Indian actor and producer
 P. R. Natarajan, Indian politician
 Pyramid Natarajan, Indian actor and producer
 R. Nataraja Mudaliar (1885–1972), Indian film director
 S. Nadarajah (died 1988), Sri Lankan lawyer and politician
 S. Natarajan, Indian politician
 Shekar Natarajan (born 1979), Indian businessman
 T. Nadaraja (1917–2004), Sri Lankan lawyer and academic

Surname
 Bhuvana Natarajan, Indian author
 Jayanthi Natarajan (born 1954), Indian lawyer and politician
 Krishnakumar Natarajan, Indian businessman
 Natarajan Chandrasekaran (born 1963), Indian businessman
 Meenakshi Natarajan (born 1973), Indian politician
 Nataraja Ramakrishna (1923–2011), Indian dance guru
 Nadarajah Raviraj (1962–2006), Sri Lankan lawyer and politician
 Nadarajah Selvarajah (born 1954), Sri Lankan librarian, writer and bibliographer
 Nadarajah Shanmugarajah (born 1912), Ceylonese engineer
 Nadarajah Thangathurai (died 1983), Sri Lankan rebel
 Navya Natarajan, Indian actress
 Priyamvada Natarajan, Indian academic

See also
 
 
 
 
 

Tamil masculine given names